Brendon Ivan Louw (born 15 November 1991) is a South African cricketer. He was included in the South Western Districts cricket team for the 2015 Africa T20 Cup. In September 2018, he was named in South Western Districts' squad for the 2018 Africa T20 Cup.

References

External links
 

1991 births
Living people
South African cricketers
South Western Districts cricketers
Warriors cricketers
North West Warriors cricketers
Western Province cricketers
Cape Cobras cricketers
People from Knysna
Wicket-keepers
Cricketers from the Western Cape